Mr. Magoo (known by his full name: J. Quincy Magoo) is a fictional cartoon character created at the UPA animation studio in 1949. Voiced by Jim Backus, Mr. Magoo is an elderly, wealthy, short-statured retiree who gets into a series of comical situations as a result of his extreme near-sightedness, compounded by his stubborn refusal to admit the problem. However, through uncanny streaks of luck, the situation always seems to work itself out for him, leaving him no worse than before. Bystanders consequently tend to think that he is a lunatic, rather than just being near-sighted. In later cartoons, he is also an actor, and generally a competent one, except for his visual impairment.

Magoo episodes were nominated for the Academy Award for Best Animated Short Film three times, and received the award twice, for When Magoo Flew (1954) and Magoo's Puddle Jumper (1956).

In 2002, TV Guide ranked Mr. Magoo number 29 on its "50 Greatest Cartoon Characters of All Time" list.

History
Mr. Magoo's first appearance was in the theatrical short cartoon "The Ragtime Bear" (1949), scripted by Millard Kaufman. His creation was a collaborative effort; animation director John Hubley is said to have partly based the character on his uncle Harry Woodruff, and W. C. Fields was another source of inspiration. In a legend circulating among medievalists, Harvard University professor Francis P. Magoun is also said to have been the model for  the character. However, there is no evidence that artist Hubley knew the scholar.  Columbia was reluctant to release the short, but did so, only because it included a bear.  However, audiences quickly realized that the real star was Magoo, one of the few "human" cartoon characters ever produced in Hollywood at the time.  The short became a box-office success.

The Magoo character was originally conceived as a mean-spirited reactionary. Hubley, who had created Magoo, handed the series completely over to creative director Pete Burness. Under Burness, Magoo won two Academy Awards for the studio with When Magoo Flew (1955) and Magoo's Puddle Jumper (1956). Burness scrubbed Magoo of his meanness and left only a few strange comments that made him appear senile or somewhat mad. At the same time, art director Sterling Sturtevant, one of the few women working in animation at the time, redesigned the character's appearance. Magoo was frequently accompanied in his on-screen escapades with his nephew Waldo, voiced at various times by either Jerry Hausner or Daws Butler.

In 1957, the record album Magoo in Hi-Fi was released. Side 1 consisted of a dialogue between Magoo and Waldo taking place while Magoo was attempting to set up his new sound system.  Music on the album was composed and conducted by Dennis Farnon and his orchestra.  Side 2, "The Mother Magoo Suite", was a series of musical pieces which included two solos by Marni Nixon.

In 1959, Mr. Magoo starred in 1001 Arabian Nights, directed by Jack Kinney, UPA's first feature-length production.

In 1994, a Sega Mega Drive game starring Mr. Magoo was in development and planned to be published by Millennium Interactive but never released.

In 1997, the live-action comedy film Mr. Magoo, produced by Walt Disney Pictures and starring Leslie Nielsen as the title character, was released in December, earning bad reviews from critics.

In 2010, a direct-to-video action-comedy film based on the character, Kung Fu Magoo, was released on DVD on May 11, 2010. It features the voices of Jim Conroy, Chris Parnell, Dylan and Cole Sprouse, and Alyson Stoner. The film is a Mexican–American co-production, produced by Classic Media, Ánima Estudios, and Santo Domingo Films. The film was directed by Andrés Couturier. His most recent appearance was in DreamWorks Animation's The Boss Baby, where he briefly appears on the cover of a comic book.

On television and in popular culture
In the 1960s, UPA turned its attention to television, and began producing the series Mister Magoo for the character.  Because UPA had shut down its animation studio in 1959, the animation for these cartoons was done by Jack Kinney Productions and Larry Harmon Pictures. The cartoons suffered from varying character designs and choppier animation, due to rushed production schedules. Magoo's nephew Waldo (voiced, as in most of the theatrical cartoons, by Jerry Hausner) was seldom seen with his uncle, now appearing in his own episodes, introduced by a brief phone conversation from Magoo's point of view, which acted as a teaser. The Waldo episodes also featured a slick-talking con man named Prezly, and always ended with a return to Magoo saying, "Oh, that Waldo and Prezly. What'll they be up to next? Hee hee hee!"

Magoo's houseboy Cholly (i.e., "Charlie") took up a lot of Waldo's slack. Cholly was an Asian stereotype with huge buck teeth and comically fractured English pronunciation. Despite his stereotyped appearance and voice, he nonetheless usually plays straight man to Magoo's shenanigans, rather than being a source of humor on his own. He is the "sane" one of the pair. His resourcefulness often saves Magoo from danger.

Still other cartoons featured Tycoon Magoo, voiced by Mel Blanc, and his bumbling assistant Worcestershire.

During the UPA television era came Mister Magoo's Christmas Carol, an abbreviated but largely faithful retelling of Charles Dickens' tale. It was the first ever animated Christmas special made for television and the first hour-long animated TV special and is considered to be a holiday classic of the 1960s, ranking alongside A Charlie Brown Christmas and  How the Grinch Stole Christmas!. The special inspired the production of an animated TV series titled The Famous Adventures of Mr. Magoo, which placed Magoo as an actor in other well-known stories. After an introduction in Magoo's backstage dressing room, Magoo was depicted in such roles as The Count of Monte Cristo, Merlin in an upbeat retelling of the story of King Arthur, Friar Tuck in Robin Hood, and Puck in A Midsummer Night's Dream.

In 1970, Mr. Magoo starred as Uncle Sam in the TV special Uncle Sam Magoo.

In the late 1970s, Mr. Magoo appeared in a new Saturday morning CBS television series called What's New, Mr. Magoo? This series was made under license by the DePatie–Freleng studio, as UPA had by this time ceased in-house cartoon production.

Mr. Magoo was planned to have a cameo in the 1988 film Who Framed Roger Rabbit, but was later dropped for unknown reasons.

Nickelodeon's Weinerville anthologizes most of his shorts.

In 1997, Mr. Magoo was portrayed by Leslie Nielsen in a live-action Mr. Magoo feature film. It failed to find critical or popular success, and some support groups for the disabled, including the National Federation of the Blind, protested it on behalf of the blind and sight-impaired.

A Mexican-U.S. animated feature, Kung-Fu Magoo, was released as a direct-to-DVD release in 2010 and made its TV debut on Disney XD in 2011.

Mr. Magoo helped advertise the General Electric line of products throughout the 1950s and 1960s, sometimes under the name J. Quincy Magoo. In 2005, Mr. Magoo became the spokesman of the optical retail store Sterling Optical. Magoo also was featured in a series of commercials for Stag Beer in the 1960s. Also in the 1960s, the Polaner company sold its line of preserves in jars decorated with images of Mr. Magoo which, when empty, could then be used as drinking glasses.

ASI Entertainment has used Mr. Magoo cartoons to "warm up" audiences when testing television comedy pilots.

Mr. Magoo's catchphrase was "Oh Magoo, you've done it again!"

Mr. Magoo is an alumnus of Rutgers University, Class of 1928. The reason behind this is that his creators wanted him to be "a college alumnus who was still fired up with the old school spirit [and they felt] Rutgers was the embodiment of the 'old school tie' in America.". He was definitely in a fraternity, since he would often shout out, "Alpha, Beta, Gamma, Rho – Rutgers, Rutgers, Go – Go – Go!"

In 2012, Mr. Magoo appeared in MetLife's "Everyone" commercial during Super Bowl XLVI.

Another television series, simply titled Mr. Magoo, began airing in 2018.,. Produced by the company Xilam, this series depicts a younger looking Magoo and his pet dog named Mr. Cat (because it meows), who replaces McBarker, the dog depicted in earlier cartoons.

Characters
 Mr. Quincy Magoo (voiced by Jim Backus) – An elderly man whose eyesight is failing, though he either does not know it or is too stubborn to admit it and/or do anything about it.
 Waldo (voiced by Jerry Hausner from 1949 to 1955 and in the 1960s series, Daws Butler from 1956 to 1959 and on the 1957 record album Magoo in Hi-Fi), and Casey Kasem in the 1970s series;– Mr. Magoo's nephew.
 Bowser - Mr. Magoo's dog (actually a Siamese cat) in the 1960s cartoons
 McBarker (voiced by Bob Ogle) – Mr. Magoo's dog in the 1970s cartoon series What's New, Mr. Magoo? A talking white Bulldog, he shares his owner's facial features and poor eyesight.
 Mother Magoo (voiced first by Henny Backus in "Meet Mother Magoo" (1956), then June Foray) – Mr. Magoo's "Momma", Linda.
 Grandma "Granny" Magoo
 Charlie (voiced by Benny Rubin) – Mr. Magoo's houseboy. Charlie's depiction as an Asian stereotype was controversial. The character was prone to unusual misuses of English, such as referring to himself in the third person as "Cholly", and calling Mr. Magoo "Missuh Magloo" and "Bloss" instead of "Boss". In the late 1960s, episodes featuring Charlie were dropped from the series and his character was never seen, referred to or even mentioned again. A version of the series that runs on the Christian network KTV retains Charlie, but dubs over his ethnic-sounding voice track.
 Prezly (voiced by Daws Butler) – Waldo's "partner in crime" in the 1960s cartoons.
 Wheeler and Dealer – Two children Mr. Magoo occasionally babysits in The Mister Magoo Show  (1960–1961)
 Tycoon Magoo (voiced by Mel Blanc) – Mr. Magoo's rich uncle. His catchphrase is "Worcestershire, get in here!"
 Worcestershire (voiced by Mel Blanc) – Tycoon Magoo's butler, who is always trying to prevent Mr. Magoo from ruining Tycoon Magoo's property.
 Additional character voices were provided by Paul Frees, Frank Nelson and Mel Blanc, among others.

Theatrical cartoon shorts

The following Mr. Magoo cartoons were either nominees for, or recipients of, the Academy Award for Best Short Subject (Cartoons):
1950: "Trouble Indemnity"
1952: "Pink and Blue Blues"
1954: "When Magoo Flew" (winner)
1956: "Magoo's Puddle Jumper" (winner)

Home media
On February 8, 2005, Sony BMG Music Entertainment’s former kids and family entertainment division, Sony Wonder (under license from Classic Media) released The Mr. Magoo Show: Complete DVD Collection.  This four-disc set featured all 26 uncut episodes of the series, digitally remastered from original film prints and presented in its original broadcast presentation and order, as well as bonus features.  This release has been discontinued and is now out of print.

On November 8, 2011, Shout! Factory (under license from Classic Media) released Mr. Magoo: The Television Collection 1960–1977 on DVD in Region 1. This 11-disc collection contains all the episodes from all three Mr. Magoo television series, including all 26 episodes of The Mister Magoo Show, all 26 episodes of The Famous Adventures of Mr. Magoo, all 16 episodes of What's New, Mister Magoo?, and the prime-time TV special Uncle Sam Magoo, as well as several bonus features.

On December 6, 2011, Sony released the feature film 1001 Arabian Nights on DVD through their Screen Classics manufactured-on-demand (MOD) program, now available through a licensing deal through the Warner Archive Collection.

In 2011, animation historian Jerry Beck announced the release of a Shout! Factory boxed set of the Mr. Magoo theatrical (UPA) shorts, under license from Sony. Originally scheduled for release in 2012, the set was pushed back for two years as Sony remastered some of the cartoons from higher quality sources, including newly discovered elements. The four-disc Mr. Magoo Theatrical Collection, containing all 53 of the Mr. Magoo theatrical shorts distributed by Columbia through 1959, and the 1959 theatrical film 1001 Arabian Nights, was released on April 22, 2014.

References

External links
 
 
 
 UPA: Mavericks, Magic, and Magoo
 Mr. Magoo at Don Markstein's Toonopedia. Archived from the original on March 10, 2016.

 
Film characters introduced in 1949
Film series introduced in 1949
Animated human characters
Animated film series
DePatie–Freleng Enterprises
DreamWorks Classics
Fictional characters with eye diseases
Male characters in animation